Haruki Yamashita is a Japanese cross-country skier who competes internationally.
 
He represented his country at the 2022 Winter Olympics.

References

Living people
1999 births
Japanese male cross-country skiers
Olympic cross-country skiers of Japan
Cross-country skiers at the 2022 Winter Olympics